Jägala Waterfall is a waterfall in Northern Estonia on Jägala River. It is the highest natural waterfall in Estonia with height about 8 meters.

References

External links

 360° QTVR fullscreen panoramas of the Jägala Waterfall

Waterfalls of Estonia
Jõelähtme Parish
Landforms of Harju County
Tourist attractions in Harju County